The 43rd Filmfare Awards were held on 31 January 1998, in Mumbai, India.

Virasat led the ceremony with 16 nominations, followed by Pardes and Border with 12 nominations each and Dil To Pagal Hai with 11 nominations.

Yash Chopra's Dil To Pagal Hai won 8 awards, including Best Film, Best Actor (for Shah Rukh Khan), Best Actress (for Madhuri Dixit) and Best Supporting Actress (for Karisma Kapoor), thus becoming the most–awarded film at the ceremony.

Shah Rukh Khan received dual nominations for Best Actor for his performances in Dil To Pagal Hai and Yes Boss, winning for the former.

Kajol became the first actress to win Best Villain, winning the award for Rajiv Rai's Gupt.

Awards

Popular Awards

Technical Awards

Special Awards

Critics' Awards

Biggest Winners
Dil To Pagal Hai – 8/11
Virasat – 7/16
Border – 5/12
Gupt – 3/8
Pardes – 3/12

See also
 42nd Filmfare Awards
 Filmfare Awards

References

External links
 Filmfare Awards at IMDb

Filmfare Awards
Filmfare